Anna Korcz (born 30 July  1968 in Warszawa, Poland) is a Polish actress.

Filmography
Ryś
Ja wam pokażę!
Na Wspólnej
Chopin: Desire for Love (Chopin. Pragnienie miłości)

References

Living people
1968 births
Polish film actresses
Actresses from Warsaw